Declan Byrne may refer to:

 Declan Byrne (Family Affairs), a character from the British soap opera Family Affairs
 Declan Byrne (radio presenter), Triple J radio presenter on Home & Hosed (2018–present)